The Senate of Jordan is the upper house of the Jordanian Parliament which, along with the House of Representatives forms the legislature of Jordan. The Senate consists of 65 members all of whom are chosen by the king of Jordan by royal decree, but must follow the terms of Constitution of Jordan. 

The presiding officer is the President of the Senate, who serves a two-year term, which can be renewed. Regular members of the Senate serve four-year terms, which can also be renewed. Meetings of the Senate are valid only if everyone is present at the meeting. Decisions are determined by the number of votes, not including the President; but if the votes are tied, the President may vote.

References	

Jordan
Politics of Jordan
Political organisations based in Jordan
 
1952 establishments in Jordan